The Badger Drive is a traditional Newfoundland folk song/ballad. The song is about a lumber drive near Badger, Newfoundland. As with many Newfoundland ballads the lyrics are about places and events and sometimes actual individuals, this song has all those qualities.Composed in 1912 by John V. Devine of King's Cove, Bonavista Bay, NL. Local and family tradition hold that Devine composed it in a Grand Falls boarding house after having been fired from his job as scaler for the Anglo Newfoundland Development Company (A.N.D.). He sang the song at a St. Patrick's Day concert at which company officials were present and allegedly won his job back. Note: Reference 1 has erroneously transcribed the phrase "caulks on their boots" as "cocks in their boots". Additional history and photos related to the Badger Drive and other log drives near Grand Falls, NL are available online in The "Badger Drive" Examined, by Bryan Marsh.

Lyrics

There is one class of men in this country that never is mentioned in song. 
And now, since their trade is advancing, they'll come out on top before long. 
They say that our sailors have danger, and likewise our warriors bold, 
But there's none know the life of a driver, what he suffers with hardship and cold.

Chorus:
With their pike poles and peavies and bateaus and all 
They're sure to drive out in the spring, that's the time 
With the caulks on their boots as they get on the logs, 
And it's hard to get over their time.

Bill Dorothey he is the manager, and he's a good man at the trade; 
And when he's around seeking drivers, he's like a train going down grade, 
But still he is a man that's kindhearted, on his word you can always depend. 
And there's never a man that works with him but likes to go with him again.

Chorus:
With their pike poles and peavies and bateaus and all 
They're sure to drive out in the spring, that's the time 
With the caulks on their boots as they get on the logs, 
And it's hard to get over their time.

I tell you today home in London, The Times it is read by each man, 
But little they think of the fellows that drove the wood on Mary Ann, 
For paper is made out of pulpwood and many things more you may know, 
And long may our men live to drive it upon Paymeoch and Tomjoe.

Chorus:
With their pike poles and peavies and bateaus and all 
They're sure to drive out in the spring, that's the time 
With the caulks on their boots as they get on the logs, 
And it's hard to get over their time.

The drive it is just below Badger, and everything is working grand, 
With a jolly good crew of picked drivers and Ronald Kelly in command, 
For Ronald is boss on the river, and I tell you he's a man that's alive, 
He drove the wood off Victoria, now he's out on the main river drive.

Chorus:
With their pike poles and peavies and bateaus and all 
They're sure to drive out in the spring, that's the time 
With the caulks on their boots as they get on the logs, 
And it's hard to get over their time.

So now to conclude and to finish, I hope that ye all will agree 
In wishing success to all Badger and the A.N.D. Company. 
And long may they live for to flourish, and continue to chop, drive and roll, 
And long may the business be managed by Mr. Dorothey and Mr. Cole.

Chorus:
With their pike poles and peavies and bateaus and all 
They're sure to drive out in the spring, that's the time 
With the caulks on their boots as they get on the logs, 
And it's hard to get over their time.

See also

 List of Newfoundland songs

References

1:https://www.mun.ca/folklore/leach/songs/NFLD1/11A-06.htm 
2:John Aston, "'The Badger Drive': Song, Historicity and Occupational Stereotyping." 
3:https://anglonewfoundlanddevelopmentcompany.wordpress.com/2014/10/20/the-badger-drive-examined/

External links
Newfoundland Heritage, Traditional Songs
Dictionary of Newfoundland English

Newfoundland and Labrador folk songs
Year of song unknown
Canadian folk songs
Songwriter unknown